Bondues is a commune in the Nord department in northern France.

Since 1997, Bondues has housed a Museum devoted to the Resistance of the Nord-Pas de Calais region. The Fort of Bondues, also known as Fort Lobau, was built near the confluence of the Marque and Deûle rivers, by General Séré de Rivières, from 1877 to 1880. It is an element of the chain of forts and fortifications constituting the defence system around Lille. It was the place of execution of 68 members of the resistance in 1943/4.

Population

Heraldry

International relations
Bondues is twinned with:
   Haywards Heath, West Sussex, England (since 1992)
  Wülfrath, Germany (since 2003)

Sports
Soccer clubs: USB (Union sportive bonduoise) and CJB (Club des Jeunes de Bondues) merged as FCB (Football club de Bondues).

See also
Communes of the Nord department

References

External links

 Town council website (in French)
 Musée de la Résistance de Bondues website

Communes of Nord (French department)
French Flanders